This is a list of the members of the Icelandic Althing from 2007 until 2009.

Election results (12 May 2007)

Bureau

President and Vice Presidents

List of chosen MPs

Notes

Lists of Members of the Althing